Johnson & Johnson  offers products and services divided into three major business sectors: Consumer Health, Medtech, and Pharmaceuticals.

Consumer Health
The Consumer Health Business Sector includes a broad range of products focused on personal healthcare used in the skin health/beauty, over-the-counter medicines, baby care, oral care, women's health, and wound care markets.  It comprises skin health/beauty, self-care, and essential health categories.

Skin health/beauty
 Aveeno
 Dabao 
 Dr. Ci:Labo
 Le Petit Marseillais
 Neutrogena
 NeoStrata
 OGX 
 BeBe Young Care
 Clean & Clear
 Exuviance
 Labo Labo
 Lubriderm
 Piz Buin
 Regaine
 Rogaine
 Sundown

Self-care
 Tylenol
 Benadryl, 
 Zyrtec 
 Motrin
 Nicorette
 Zarbee's. 
 Calpol
 Codral
 Doktor Mom
 Dolormin 
 Frenadol
 Imodium
 ORSL
 Pepcid
 Sudafed
 Visine

Essential health 
 Johnson's Baby
 Listerine
 Stayfree
 Carefree
 BAND-AID
 Neosporin
 Aveeno Baby
 Desitin
 Polysporin
 Penaten
 O.B. (brand)

Medtech
The company's major franchises in the Medtech segment include Interventional Solutions, Orthopaedics, Surgery (General & Advanced), and Vision.

Ear, nose and throat products (Acclarent)
 Eustachian Tube Balloon Dilation System
 Navigation Balloon Dilation System

Cardiac Arrhythmia Diagnosis & Treatment Products (Biosense Webster)
 Carto 3 System 
 Thermocool Smarttouch SF Catheter
 Carto Vizigo Bi-Directional Guiding Sheath
 Pentaray Nav ECO High Density Mapping Catheter

Neurovascular products (Cerenovus) 
 Embotrap III Revascularization Device 
 Embovac Aspiration Catheter
 Cerenovus Large Bore Catheter
 Cerenovus Nimbus
 Cerebase DA Guide Sheath
 Trufill n-BCA Liquid Embolic System

Orthopaedics products (DePuy Synthes)
 Velys Digital Surgery platform
 Attune Cementless Fixed Bearing Knee
 Actis Hip Stem
 Inhance Shoulder System
 Dynatape Suture
 Trumatch Graft Cage
 Symphony OCT System

Surgical products (Ethicon) 
 Vicryl
 Echelon stapling products
 Stratafix knotless tissue devices
 Surgicel absorbable hemostats
 Monarch platform

Breast augmentation and reconstruction products (Mentor) 
 MemoryGel Breast Implants
 MemoryShape Breast Implants
 Artoura Breast Tissue Expanders
 CPX Breast Tissue Expenders
 Mentor Saline Breast Implants

Eye health products (Johnson & Johnson Vision) 
 Acuvue
 Tecnis
 Catalys
 TearScience
 iDesign

Pharmaceuticals
The company's major franchises in the Pharmaceuticals segment include Immunology, Neuroscience, Infectious Disease and Vaccines, Oncology, Cardiovascular and Metabolism, and Pulmonary Hypertension.

Immunology therapies
 Remicade
 Simponi
 Simponi Aria
 Stelara
 Tremfya
 
Infectious Diseases therapies 
 Edurant
 Intelence
 Prezcobix
 Prezista
 Symtuza
 Janssen COVID-19 vaccine

Neuroscience therapies 
 Concerta
 Invega
 Ponvory
 Risperdal Consta
 Spravato
 Topamax
 Trevicta
 Xeplion
 
Oncology therapies 
 Balversa
 Carvykti
 Dacogen
 Darzalex
 Eprex
 Erleada
 Imbruvica
 Procrit
 Rybrevant 
 Valchlor
 Velcade
 Yondelis
 Zytiga

Cardiovascular, Metabolism, & Retina therapies 
 Xarelto
 Invokana
 Invokamet

Pulmonary Hypertension therapies 
 Uptravi
 Opsumit
 Veletri
 Tracleer
 Ventavis

References

Johnson & Johnson brands